Cryoprecipitate, also called cryo for short, is a frozen blood product prepared from blood plasma. To create cryoprecipitate, fresh frozen plasma thawed to 1–6 °C is then centrifuged and the precipitate is collected. The precipitate is resuspended in a small amount of residual plasma (generally 10–15 mL) and is then re-frozen for storage. It is often transfused to adults as two 5-unit pools instead of as a single product. One of the most important constituents is factor VIII (also called antihaemophilic factor or AHF), which is why cryoprecipitate is sometimes called cryoprecipitated antihaemophilic factor or cryoprecipitated AHF. In many clinical contexts, use of whole cryoprecipitate has been replaced with use of clotting factor concentrates made therefrom (where available), but the whole form is still routinely stocked by many, if not most, hospital blood banks. Cryo can be stored at −18 °C or colder for 12 months from the original collection date. After thawing, single units of cryo (or units pooled using a sterile method) can be stored at 20–24 °C for up to 6 hours. If units of cryo are pooled in an open system, they can only be held at 20–24 °C for up to 4 hours. Presently cryo cannot be re-frozen for storage after it is thawed for use if it is not transfused.

Cross-matching (compatibility testing) is not necessary and all ABO groups are acceptable for transfusion to people of all ABO types.

Medical uses
Medical uses for giving cryoprecipitate include:
 Haemophilia – Used for emergency back up when factor concentrates are not available.
 von Willebrand disease – Not currently recommended unless last reserve. ddAVP is first line, followed by factor concentrates.
 Hypofibrinogenaemia (low fibrinogen levels), as can occur with massive transfusions
 Afibrinogenemia
 Bleeding from excessive anticoagulation – Fresh frozen plasma contains most of the coagulation factors and is an alternative choice when anticoagulation has to be reversed quickly.
 Massive haemorrhage – RBCs and volume expanders are preferred therapies.
 Disseminated intravascular coagulation
 Uremic bleeding tendency
 Reversing tpa (with aminocaproic acid)

Adverse effects
Adverse effects reported with the usage of cryoprecipitate include hemolytic transfusion reactions, febrile non-hemolytic reactions, allergic reactions (ranging from urticaria to anaphylaxis), septic reactions, transfusion related acute lung injury, circulatory overload, transfusion-associated graft-versus-host disease, and post-transfusion purpura.

Composition
Each unit (around 10 to 15 mL) typically provides:
 Fibrinogen 150–250 mg with a half-life of 100–150 hours
 Factor VIII 80–150 U with a half-life of 12 hours
 Factor XIII 50–75 U with a half-life of 150–300 hours.
 von Willebrand factor 100–150 U with a half-life of 24 hours
Cryoprecipitate also contains fibronectin; however there are no clear indications for fibronectin replacement.

US standards require manufacturers to test at least four units each month, and the products must have a minimum of 150 mg or more of fibrinogen and 80 IU of factor VIII. Individual products may actually have less than these amounts as long as the average remains above these minimums.  Typical values for a unit are substantially higher, and aside from infants it is rare to transfuse just one unit.

History 
While the method for the creation of Cryo was discovered by Judith Graham Pool from Stanford University in 1964, it was initially approved in 1971 by the U.S. Food and Drug Administration under the name Cryoprecipitated AHF for the Hoxworth Blood Center University of Cincinnati Medical Center.

References

Blood products
Transfusion medicine